There was a high level of conscientious objection in East Germany.

Introduction of conscription
In April 1962 the GDR government introduced military conscription. The period of compulsory service was at least 18 months, and adult males between 18 and 26 were eligible. Service in the National People's Army (in German abbreviated as NVA), the paramilitary forces of the People's Police and the motorised rifles regiment of the Ministry for State Security fulfilled this service obligation. (In the Federal Republic of Germany, conscription was introduced in 1958.)

In the first year, despite the possibility of imprisonment or worse, 231 draftees refused to serve. Most were members of the Jehovah's Witnesses. The number increased to 287 when the second year's cohort was conscripted.

The GDR's socialist government viewed conscientious objectors as enemies of the state, and all 287 were arrested. When the country's influential Protestant Church protested, the government decided to provide a legal means for conscientious objectors to serve as non-combatants in the armed forces.

Baueinheiten
On 16 September 1964 the GDR government announced the formation of non-combat construction units, or Baueinheiten, to provide an alternative for conscripts who could not bear arms because of a personal objection to military service. The Bausoldaten lived in barracks and were subject to military discipline, but did not bear arms or participate in combat training.  Their grey uniforms resembled those of the regular infantry with the symbol of a spade on their shoulder boards which had pale green edges. Normally, construction units were isolated from soldiers in regular units to prevent the spread of pacifist ideas.

Though outwardly peaceful in appearance, soldiers in Baueinheiten were obliged to make a promise of loyalty in which they stated that they would "fight against all enemies and obey their superiors unconditionally", though this was replaced by an oath to "increase defence readiness" in the 1980s. 

They performed military construction and rear-guard services, repaired tanks and military equipment, as well as some tasks in the industrial and social-service sectors, were subject to military law and disciplinary regulations, were commanded by NVA officers and non-commissioned officers (NCOs), and received engineer training and political education. 

In 1983, of the 230,000 soldiers in the NVA, 0.6 percent—about 1,400—were allowed to serve in the construction units.  According to one report, however, the number of conscripts electing such service was so high that draft officials claimed the plan was over fulfilled, and in 1983 young East Germans unwilling to bear arms had to join the regular troops.  In February 1983, in Schwerin, Dresden, and East Berlin, five young men were sentenced to eighteen months in prison because they tried to exercise their right to join the construction units. 

Service in the construction troops did, however, have certain consequences. In the 1970s, East German leaders acknowledged that former construction soldiers were at a disadvantage when they rejoined the civilian sphere.  They were not allowed to enter certain professions or to pursue a university education.  In 1984, however, SED General Secretary Erich Honecker and Defence Minister Army General Heinz Hoffmann asserted that construction soldiers no longer suffered such discrimination; like others who had completed their military service, they were given preference in the university admission process.

Prague Spring
In 1968 Warsaw Pact states, with the tacit support but not direct involvement of East Germany, invaded Czechoslovakia and deposed Alexander Dubček in what came to be known as the Prague Spring.

This invasion appalled people all over the world, but especially East Germans, many of whom felt guilty for letting their government support it. Following the Prague Spring, many young East German men refused to serve even in Baueinheiten, as they felt that something akin to another Prague Spring could be just around the corner, and they wished to play no part in it.

Leaving East Germany
Between 1984 and 1985, 71,000 East Germans were expelled from the country for participation in civil rights movements. Many people who wished to emigrate from East Germany would do things such as refuse to serve in the NVA to be put on the "black list" and expelled.

By the late 1980s, the vast majority of conscientious objectors was composed of people who wished to emigrate.

Literature
Bernd Eisenfeld: Kriegsdienstverweigerung in der DDR - ein Friedensdienst? Genesis, Befragung, Analyse, Dokumentation. Haag+Herchen, Frankfurt 1978. .

References

External links
Translation of "The Meaning of Being a Soldier", a booklet issued to East German draftees

Conscientious objection
East German law
Military of East Germany